Ethel Kennedy ( Skakel; born April 11, 1928) is an American human rights advocate. She is the widow of U.S. Senator Robert F. Kennedy, a sister-in-law of President John F. Kennedy, and the sixth child of George Skakel and Ann Brannack. Shortly after her husband's 1968 assassination, Kennedy founded the Robert F. Kennedy Center for Justice and Human Rights. The organization is a non-profit charity working to fulfill his dream of a just and peaceful world. In 2014, Ethel Kennedy was awarded the Presidential Medal of Freedom by President Barack Obama.

Early life and education
Ethel Skakel was born at Chicago Lying-in Hospital to businessman George Skakel and his former secretary Ann Brannack. Her parents were killed in a 1955 plane crash. She is the Skakels' third of four daughters and sixth child of seven, having five older siblings, Georgeann, James, George Jr., Rushton, and Patricia, and one younger sister, Ann. George was a Protestant of Dutch descent while Ann was a Catholic of Irish ancestry. Ethel and her siblings were raised Catholic in Greenwich, Connecticut. George Skakel was the founder of Great Lakes Carbon Corporation, now a division of SGLCarbon. Ethel attended the all-girls Greenwich Academy in Greenwich, and she graduated from the Convent of the Sacred Heart in Manhattan in 1945.

In September 1945, Skakel began her college education at Manhattanville College, where she was a classmate of future sister-in-law Jean Kennedy. Ethel first met Jean's brother, Robert F. Kennedy, during a ski trip to Mont Tremblant Resort in Quebec in December 1945. During this trip, Robert Kennedy began dating Ethel's elder sister, Patricia. After that relationship ended, he began dating Ethel. She campaigned for Robert's elder brother, John F. Kennedy, in his 1946 campaign for the United States Congress; she also wrote her college thesis on his book Why England Slept. Skakel received a bachelor's degree from Manhattanville in 1949.

Marriage and family

Robert Kennedy and Ethel Skakel became engaged in February 1950 and were married on June 17, 1950, at St. Mary's Catholic Church in Greenwich, Connecticut.

During the 1950s, Robert F. Kennedy worked for the federal government in investigatory roles for the United States Senate as a counsel. The Kennedys purchased Hickory Hill, an estate in McLean, Virginia, from Robert's brother John and his wife, Jackie. Robert and Ethel Kennedy held many gatherings at their home and were known for their impressive and eclectic guest lists.

In 1962, President Kennedy assigned Ethel and Robert to tour fourteen countries within a 28-day goodwill trip. Though the trip was said to be informal, the host countries viewed her and Robert as stand-ins for the President and First Lady.

On November 22, 1963, Ethel learned of President Kennedy's assassination from her husband. She had answered the phone, identified the caller as FBI director J. Edgar Hoover and handed the phone over to Robert, who then informed her of the shooting. The FBI Director had never called the Attorney General's home before. Ethel was reportedly devastated by the assassination and worried for her niece and nephew.

Ethel urged her husband to enter the Democratic primary for the 1968 presidential election. Biographer Evan Thomas portrayed her as RFK's "most consistent advocate of a race for the White House."

Assassination of Robert F. Kennedy

Shortly after midnight on June 5, 1968, Robert F. Kennedy was mortally wounded by Sirhan Sirhan and died early the next day at the age of 42. U.S. President Lyndon B. Johnson declared a national day of mourning. Ethel sent Johnson a handwritten note on June 19, thanking him and his wife, First Lady Lady Bird Johnson, for the help they had given her and the Kennedy family. Following her husband's assassination, Ethel Kennedy publicly stated that she would never marry again. For a time, she was escorted to dinners, parties, and the theater by singer and family friend Andy Williams.

Children
Robert and Ethel Kennedy had eleven children over 18 years of marriage: Kathleen, Joseph, Robert Jr., David, Courtney, Michael, Kerry, Christopher, Max, Douglas, and Rory. Rory was born after Senator Kennedy was assassinated. Kathleen served as Lieutenant Governor of Maryland from 1995 to 2003, and Joseph was a member of the U.S. House of Representatives from the 8th congressional district of Massachusetts from 1987 to 1999.

Robert F. Kennedy Center for Justice and Human Rights

Ethel Kennedy founded the Robert F. Kennedy Center for Justice and Human Rights (now known as Robert F. Kennedy Human Rights in 1968.

In February 2001, Kennedy visited Rodolfo Montiel and another peasant activist at their jail in Iguala, presenting Rodolfo with the Chico Mendes Award on behalf of American environmental group, the Sierra Club.

In March 2016, Kennedy was among hundreds who marched near the home of Wendy's chairman Nelson Peltz in Palm Beach, Florida, as part of an effort by the Coalition of Immokalee Workers, a farm workers' group, to convince the company to pay an additional one cent per pound of tomatoes to increase the wages of field workers.

As of September 2018, Kennedy's daughter Kerry Kennedy was president of Robert F. Kennedy Human Rights.

Later life
Kennedy sold Hickory Hill for $8.25 million in December 2009. 

During the 2008 Democratic Party presidential primaries, Ethel Kennedy endorsed Barack Obama. She publicly supported and held fundraisers at Hickory Hill for numerous politicians that included Virginia gubernatorial candidate Brian Moran. Kennedy hosted a $6-million fundraising dinner for Obama at Hickory Hill in June 2008. The $28,500-a-plate dinner was headlined by former Democratic presidential candidate and DNC chairman Howard Dean.

In 2012, Kennedy appeared in a documentary about her life; the documentary was directed by her youngest child, daughter Rory. The documentary, entitled Ethel, covers Kennedy's early political involvement, her life with Robert F. Kennedy, and the years following his death when she raised eleven children on her own. It features interviews with Ethel and her children interspersed with family videos and archival photos.

In August 2014, Kennedy nominated President Barack Obama to do the Ice Bucket Challenge as part of an effort to raise funds and awareness about amyotrophic lateral sclerosis (ALS, also known as Lou Gehrig's disease). Obama declined to perform the fundraising stunt, but expressed appreciation to Kennedy and made a monetary donation to the cause.

As of 2019, Kennedy resides at the Kennedy Compound in Hyannis Port, Massachusetts.

Kennedy is a practicing Catholic who often attends Mass.

Legacy and awards
In 1981, President Ronald Reagan honored Kennedy with the Robert F. Kennedy medal in the White House Rose Garden.

In 2014, a bridge over the Anacostia River was renamed the Ethel Kennedy Bridge in her honor, in recognition of her advocacy for environmentalism and social causes in the District of Columbia.

Also in 2014, Kennedy was awarded the Presidential Medal of Freedom by President Obama for her dedication to "advancing the cause of social justice, human rights, environmental protection, and poverty reduction by creating countless ripples of hope to effect change around the world."

See also
 Kennedy family tree

References

Citations

Further reading
 Schlesinger, Arthur Meier Jr., Robert Kennedy and His Times, Houghton Mifflin Harcourt, 2002, 
 Taraborrelli, J. Randy. Jackie, Ethel, Joan: Women of Camelot. Warner Books: 2000.

External links

 
 American Experience: RFK People & Events —From PBS
 The Documentary Film – Ethel (2012)
 

1928 births
American socialites
Convent of the Sacred Heart (NYC) alumni
Illinois Democrats
Ethel
Living people
Manhattanville College alumni
Massachusetts Democrats
New York (state) Democrats
People from Chicago
People from McLean, Virginia
Virginia Democrats
Presidential Medal of Freedom recipients
Robert F. Kennedy
Schools of the Sacred Heart alumni
Spouses of New York (state) politicians